Connor McGovern may refer to:

 Connor McGovern (American football, born 1993), center for the Denver Broncos and New York Jets
 Connor McGovern (American football, born 1997), guard for the Dallas Cowboys